Monja is a given name. Notable people with the name include:

Monja Danischewsky (1911–1994), English film producer and screenwriter
Monja Jaona (1910–1994), Malagasy politician
Monja Liseki (born 1979), Tanzanian footballer
Monja Roindefo (born 1965), Malagasy politician